The Opera Tunnel is a motorway tunnel system under Oslo city center between Filipstad in the west and Ryen in the east. The tunnel consists of four parts built at different times. From west to east are the Festning Tunnel and Bjørvika Tunnel, which are part of European route E18, and the Ekeberg Tunnel and Svartdal Tunnel, which make up a branch of European Route E6.

Opening of the tunnel 
The tunnel was opened on 20 September 2010 when the Bjørvika Tunnel was opened and all of the tunnels were combined into the Opera Tunnel complex.

 Festning Tunnel opened in 1990.
 Ekeberg Tunnel opened in 1995.
 Svartdal Tunnel opened in 2000.
 Bjørvika Tunnel/the Opera Tunnel were officially opened by King Harald V 17 September 2010.

The name Opera Tunnel was chosen by a poll of the readers of the newspaper Aften.

References 

Tunnels completed in 2010
Subsea tunnels in Norway
Fjord City
Road tunnels in Oslo
European route E18 in Norway
European route E6 in Norway
2010 establishments in Norway